Warriors of Kudlak is the third serial of the first series of the British science fiction television series The Sarah Jane Adventures. It first aired in two weekly parts on the CBBC channel on 15 and 22 October 2007.

Plot
Sarah Jane investigates the disappearance of teenager Lance Metcalf three days ago. She discovers the day he disappeared, there was an unexpected but brief storm. Mr Smith cross-references 24 disappearances in the previous year with such weather conditions, all of them in towns and cities across the United Kingdom. Aided by Maria, Sarah Jane discovers shells that are the byproduct of teleportation, meaning that aliens abducted Lance.

Meanwhile, Clyde takes Luke to the laser tag centre Combat 3000 to help him understand what games are for. Using Combat 3000 as war games, Mr Grantham and his business partner, the wounded Uvodni general Uvlavad Kudlak, are kidnapping young humans as warriors to fight in an interplanetary war with the Malakh Empire. They follow the orders of the Mistress, an artificial intelligence on Kudlak's spaceship. Luke and Clyde pass two levels of Combat 3000, supposedly to qualify for the championships. They are instead teleported aboard the Uvodni ship in Earth's orbit, and free themselves and the other children, including Lance, from their crates.

Mr Smith uses a military satellite to trace the heart of the storm that took Lance to Combat 3000. Sarah Jane and Maria blackmail Mr Grantham into transporting them to the Uvodni ship, where they find and talk to the Mistress. When Kudlak brings the children to the Mistress, everyone is reunited. Preparing to kill them, Kudlak is stopped by Luke, who during his attempted escape has discovered a message made by the Uvodni Emperor ten years ago in the computer banks, revealing an armistice has been made with the Malakh. Not programmed to recognise "peace" as a concept, the Mistress had buried the message and kept leading in recruitments. With the truth revealed, Kudlak destroys the Mistress, releases the children and swears to do what he can to reunite all the surviving past recruits with their families.

Continuity
This serial was the first of The Sarah Jane Adventures not to feature Alan Jackson and Chrissie Jackson, although Alan is mentioned.
Lance has posters from the DVDs featured in the Doctor Who episode "Blink" in his room, as seen when Sarah Jane meets Lance's mother.
Sarah Jane mentions her UNIT training in this serial.
In the book adaptation of this episode, one of the Combat 3000 warriors is from Deffry Vale High School, also featured in the Doctor Who episode, "School Reunion", which reintroduced Sarah Jane and K-9.
 While Mr Smith is searching for missing children, there is a poster in the background of Sarah Jane's attic depicting the design of John Lumic's Cybermen.
 One of the aliens briefly depicted by Mr Smith is the Beast from the Doctor Who episodes "The Impossible Planet" and "The Satan Pit."
 Slabs are used to capture Luke and Clyde as seen before in the Doctor Who episode "Smith and Jones".
 Sarah Jane's business card shows her address as 21 Bannerman Road, as does the number plate on her door in Eye of the Gorgon, rather than 13 Bannerman Road which is stated throughout the second and third series.

 Sarah Jane makes a remark commenting on how many times she's had guns pointed at her and says that she's lost count
 Sarah Jane speculates that Lance might become the first man to walk on Mars, before adding "first human man," alluding to the Martian race of Ice Warriors whom she met with the Third Doctor in The Monster of Peladon.
One of Kudlaks race appears briefly in the Doctor Who episode "The Pandorica Opens"

Outside references
Lance Metcalf's father was in the army and was killed in Iraq. His death was implied to have taken place during the Iraq War.
Clyde references Obi-Wan Kenobi, saying that he is Luke's mentor.  He also references Captain Kirk, after Jen earlier says, "Beam me up, Scotty!". Mr Grantham says "a Galaxy far, far away".
The popular series of video games Halo is also mentioned in this serial.
The recruitment of children in this episode is similar to the movie The Last Starfighter. In that movie, an arcade game of the same name is used to test the qualifications of warriors. This leads to a teenager being recruited to fight in an interstellar war.
The kidnapping of children to be used in an alien war is also the premise of the Virgin New Adventures novel Toy Soldiers. The novel Winner Takes All also has a very similar plot involving the kidnapping of people to fight an alien war using games as a recruitment tool.

Novelisation

This was the fourth of eleven Sarah Jane Adventures serials to be adapted as a novel. Written by Gary Russell, the book was first published in Paperback on 1 November 2007.

References

External links

Sarah Jane Adventures homepage
Writing Kudlak – The writer Phil Gladwin describes the origins of this episode.

Novelisation

The Sarah Jane Adventures episodes
2007 British television episodes
Television episodes set in outer space
Television episodes about child abduction